Bertran or Bertrán is a given name. Notable people with the name include:

Bertran Carbonel (1252–1265), Provençal troubadour
Bertran d'Alamanon (1229–1266), Provençal knight, troubadour, an official, diplomat, and ambassador of the court of the Count of Provence
Bertran de Born (1140–1215), baron from the Limousin in France, and one of the major Occitan troubadours of the twelfth century
Bertran de Born lo Filhs (1179–1233), Limousin knight and troubadour
Bertran de Gourdon (1209–1231), the lord of Gourdon, knight, and troubadour
Bertran del Pojet (fl. 1222), Provençal castellan and troubadour
Bertran Folcon d'Avignon (1202–1233), Provençal nobleman and troubadour
Marc Bertrán Vilanova (born 1982), Spanish footballer
Pierre Bertran de Balanda (1887–1946), French horse rider

See also
Barneville-la-Bertran, commune in the Calvados department in the Basse-Normandie region in north-western France